Asa Breed is the third studio album by American music producer Matthew Dear. It was released via Ghostly International in 2007. It peaked at number 20 on the Billboard Top Dance/Electronic Albums chart. The title of the album comes from a character in the Kurt Vonnegut novel, Cat's Cradle.

Critical reception

At Metacritic, which assigns a weighted average score out of 100 to reviews from mainstream critics, Asa Breed received an average score of 73, based on 15 reviews, indicating "generally favorable reviews".

Resident Advisor named it the 39th-best album of the decade.

Track listing

Personnel
Credits adapted from liner notes.

 Matthew Dear – production
 Mobius Band – guitar (5), bass guitar (5)
 Collin Dupuis – drums (11), drones (11), selected recording
 Dave Cooley – mixing (2, 3, 5, 8, 10, 11)
 Tony Gillis – mastering
 Sam Valenti IV – executive production
 Will Calcutt – artwork

Charts

References

External links
 

2007 albums
Matthew Dear albums
Ghostly International albums